Farès Bousdira (born 20 September 1953) is an Algerian-born French former professional footballer who played as a midfielder.

While at Lens, he played his only match for the France national football team, a 2–0 friendly win over Poland on 24 April 1976 at his club ground, the Stade Félix-Bollaert.

References

External links
 
 
 Profile on French federation official site 
 Profile

1953 births
Living people
French footballers
Algerian emigrants to France
France international footballers
Association football midfielders
RC Lens players
OGC Nice players
Angers SCO players
Stade Rennais F.C. players
Bourges 18 players
AS Béziers Hérault (football) players
FC Montceau Bourgogne players
Ligue 1 players
Ligue 2 players
Expatriate footballers in Réunion